The 2019 South American Rhythmic Gymnastics Championships were held in Bogotá, Colombia, May 30–June 2, 2019. The competition was organized by the Colombian Gymnastics Federation, and approved by the International Gymnastics Federation.

Participating nations

Medal summary

Senior

Medal table

Senior

References 

2019 in gymnastics
Rhythmic Gymnastics,2019
International gymnastics competitions hosted by Colombia
2019 in Colombian sport
May 2019 sports events in South America
June 2019 sports events in South America